Players and pairs who neither have high enough rankings nor receive wild cards may participate in a qualifying tournament held one week before the annual Wimbledon Tennis Championships.

Seeds

  Royce Deppe /  Byron Talbot (qualifying competition, lucky losers)
  Wayne Ferreira /  Piet Norval (qualified)
  Massimo Cierro /  Ģirts Dzelde (first round)
  Rikard Bergh /  Henrik Holm (qualifying competition, lucky losers)
  Neil Borwick /  David Lewis (first round)
  Patrick Baur /  Christian Saceanu (qualified)
  Dean Botha /  Alexander Mronz (first round)
  Andrei Olhovskiy /  Olli Rahnasto Second round
  Steve Guy /  Srinivasan Vasudevan (qualifying competition)
  Arnaud Boetsch /  Guillaume Raoux (qualified)

Qualifiers

  Arnaud Boetsch /  Guillaume Raoux
  Wayne Ferreira /  Piet Norval
  Gavin Pfitzner /  Torben Theine
  Paul Hand /  Chris Wilkinson
  Patrick Baur /  Christian Saceanu

Lucky losers

  Royce Deppe /  Byron Talbot
  Rikard Bergh /  Henrik Holm

Qualifying draw

First qualifier

Second qualifier

Third qualifier

Fourth qualifier

Fifth qualifier

External links

1990 Wimbledon Championships – Men's draws and results at the International Tennis Federation

Men's Doubles Qualifying
Wimbledon Championship by year – Men's doubles qualifying